Villa Rica High School is a public high school, part of the Carroll County School System, located in Villa Rica, Georgia. The school's mascot is the Wildcat.

Football team mass baptism
In 2015, the school came under severe scrutiny for allowing a local pastor to perform mass baptisms on the school football team during an official on-campus practice. The Freedom From Religion Foundation promptly presented the school district with a letter threatening legal action if steps were not taken to prevent another occurrence in the future. An investigation by the school district concluded that the school "failed to follow district facility usage procedures for outside groups using school facilities". A miscommunication was later claimed between the head football coach and pastor regarding ability to perform such actions on a public school campus.

Basketball game fight
On January 25, 2022, a fight broke out at a basketball game against Lithia Springs High School that took place at the Villa Rica school gym. The fight, which started in the stands, spilled onto the court and caused the game to be suspended. After an investigation, authorities charged seven teenagers with affray and disruption of a public school.

Notable alumni

 Brandon Tolbert, former NFL player
 Herman Weaver, former NFL player
 Jae Crowder, NBA player

References

External links
 

Public high schools in Georgia (U.S. state)
Villa Rica, Georgia
Schools in Carroll County, Georgia